Events in the year 1894 in China.

Incumbents
Guangxu Emperor (20th year)

Events
July 25 - Battle of Pungdo
July 28–29 - Battle of Seonghwan
September 15 - Battle of Pyongyang
September 17 - Battle of the Yalu River (1894)
October 24 - Battle of Jiuliancheng
November 21 - Battle of Lushunkou

Births
October 5 - Deng Zhongxia

Deaths
September 17 - Deng Shichang

References

 
1890s in China
Years of the 19th century in China